Patrik Nilson (born 18 May 1981) is a retired Swedish ice hockey player. Nilson was part of the Djurgården Swedish champions' team of 2000 and 2001. Nilson made 38 Elitserien appearances for Djurgården.

References

Swedish ice hockey players
Djurgårdens IF Hockey players
1981 births
Living people